Udumalai K. Radhakrishnan is an Indian politician and a member of the 15th Tamil Nadu Legislative Assembly. He was elected from the Udumalpet constituency as a candidate of the AIADMK party. He served as the Chairman of Tamil Nadu Arasu Cable TV Corporation Limited from 2011 to 2016. Again he was appointed the Chairman of Tamil Nadu Arasu Cable TV Corporation Limited in July 2019.

Jayalalithaa appointed Radhakrishnan as Minister for Housing and Urban Development in May 2016. This was his first cabinet post.

In April 2017, Radhakrishnan was one of three AIADMK ministers against whom police filed a First Information Report after allegations of obstructing officials who were conducting raids related to income tax. He and R. Kamaraj were alleged to have done so at the house of the Minister for Health, C. Vijayabhaskar.

Personal life 
Radhakrishnan was born on 16 December 1965 at Pollachi, Coimbatore district, Madras State (present-day Tamil Nadu). After completing school, he completed B.Com from Nallamuthu Gounder Mahalingam College. He is married to Krishna Brindha Radhakrishnan and has one daughter and one son. He is a cable TV operator and agriculturist by occupation.

Elections contested

Tamil Nadu Legislative elections

References 

1965 births
Living people
Tamil Nadu MLAs 2016–2021
State cabinet ministers of Tamil Nadu
All India Anna Dravida Munnetra Kazhagam politicians
Coimbatore district
Tamil Nadu MLAs 2021–2026